This list of Copenhagen topics provides an overview of lists related to Copenhagen, Denmark.

Buildings and structures
 List of churches in Copenhagen
 List of museums in and around Copenhagen
 List of Copenhagen Metro stations
 List of public art in Copenhagen
 List of public art in Rosenborg Castle Gardens
 List of public art in Ørstedsparken
 List of public art in Copenhagen Botanical Garden
 List of public art in Copenhagen

Geography
 Districts of Copenhagen
 List of parks and open spaces in Copenhagen

Culture
 List of songs about Copenhagen
 List of annual events in metropolitan Copenhagen

Economy
 List of companies based in metropolitan Copenhagen

Sport
 List of F.C. Copenhagen Players of the Year
 List of F.C. Copenhagen managers
 List of F.C. Copenhagen players

History
 Timeline of Copenhagen history
 List of lord mayors of Copenhagen